William Ashton (1575–1646) was the English Member of Parliament for Hertford in 1621–1625 and Appleby in 1626 and 1628.

He had considerable court connections, including Robert Cecil, the Treasurer, and his son William Cecil.

In retirement he purchased the grant of a large part of the Royal forest of Feckenham as it was disafforested and an estate in Hertfordshire.

Despite his court connections, he was active in support of Parliament in the English Civil War, especially in the Middlesex County Committee. He also became a Presbyterian Elder.

References

1575 births
1646 deaths
English courtiers
Roundheads
English MPs 1621–1622
English MPs 1624–1625
English MPs 1625
English MPs 1628–1629